Matthew Keith "Matt" Franklin is an American cryptographer, and a professor of computer science at the University of California, Davis.

Education and employment
Franklin did his undergraduate studies at Pomona College, graduating in 1983 with a degree in mathematics, and was awarded a master's degree in mathematics in 1985 by the University of California, Berkeley. He earned his Ph.D. in computer science from Columbia University in 1994, under the joint supervision of Zvi Galil and Moti Yung. Prior to joining the UC Davis faculty in 2000, he worked at Xerox PARC, Bell Labs, and AT&T Labs.

From 2009 to 2014, Franklin was editor-in-chief of the Journal of Cryptology.

Research contributions
Franklin is particularly known for the Boneh–Franklin scheme, a cryptography scheme he developed with Dan Boneh that uses the mathematics of elliptic curves to automatically generate public and private key pairs based on the identities of the communicating parties. In 2013, he and Boneh were winners of the Gödel Prize for their work on this system.

Selected publications
.
.
.
.
.
.

References

External links
Home page at UC Davis

Year of birth missing (living people)
Living people
American computer scientists
American cryptographers
Public-key cryptographers
Pomona College alumni
University of California, Berkeley alumni
Columbia University alumni
University of California, Davis faculty
Gödel Prize laureates
Scientists at PARC (company)
Scientists at Bell Labs